Nagib Barrak (born 1940) is a Lebanese alpine skier. He competed in two events at the 1968 Winter Olympics.

References

1940 births
Living people
Lebanese male alpine skiers
Olympic alpine skiers of Lebanon
Alpine skiers at the 1968 Winter Olympics